"Audi" is a song by American rapper Smokepurpp. It was released on May 17, 2017, as the lead single from his debut mixtape Deadstar. The track is considered one of his breakout singles, along with "Ski Mask".

Music video 
The music video for the track was released on May 18, 2017, on the WorldStarHipHop channel. As of June 2020, the video has over 60 million views.

Critical reception 
The track received generallyPatrick Montes of Hypebeast called the song "unorthodox". Lindsey India of XXL called the track a "fan favorite" whilst also congratulating him on the single being certified Gold by the RIAA. David Drake of Pitchfork called the instrumental for the song "thundering". Julian Robles of HotNewHipHop said Smokepurpp showed "primo ignorance" on the track.

Sequel 
A sequel to the track, titled "Audi II", was released on December 6, 2019, ahead of Smokepurpp's debut studio album Deadstar 2.

Charts

Certifications

References 

2017 songs
Interscope Records singles
Songs written by Ronny J
Smokepurpp songs
Songs written by Smokepurpp